Morar Cantonment is a cantonment town in Gwalior district in the Indian state of Madhya Pradesh. It is part of an urban agglomeration together with neighbouring Gwalior. Adv. Rakesh Singh Chauhan is the longest serving Former Chairman & Vice-President of Cantonment Board Morar.

Morar is also a community development block, which has its headquarters at Gwalior. As of 2011, the block's population is 177,921, in 33,511 households.

Demographics

As of the 2011 Census of India, Morar Cantonment had a population of 48,464. Males constitute 57% of the population and females 43%. Morar Cantonment has an average literacy rate of 83%, higher than the state average of 69%: male literacy is 87%, and female literacy is 69%. In Morar 13% of the population are children up to 6 years of age.

Government
Morar Cantonment forms one constituency, Gwalior Rural, in the state legislative assembly, the "Madhya Pradesh Vidhan Sabha".

Gwalior Military Station
Morar Cantonment is home to several units of the Indian Army. There are a number of static and mobile units housed within its confines.

Villages
Morar block has 176 rural villages, listed below:

Notable people
John Sparks (1873–1920), cricketer and Royal Navy officer

References

External links
 Morar Cantonment at Directorate General Defence Estates, Ministry of Defence, Government of India

Cities and towns in Gwalior district
Gwalior
Cantonments of British India
Cantonments of India